Eleutherodactylus longipes is a species of frog in the family Eleutherodactylidae. It is endemic to Mexico and occurs on the Sierra Madre Oriental between central Nuevo León and adjacent Coahuila in the north and northern Hidalgo in the south. It is also known as the long-footed chirping frog and longfoot robber frog, among other names.

Several records are from caves. It is threatened by habitat loss caused by logging. Chytridiomycosis remains a potential threat. It might be present in the Cumbres de Monterrey National Park.

References

longipes
Fauna of the Sierra Madre Oriental
Endemic amphibians of Mexico
Taxa named by Spencer Fullerton Baird
Amphibians described in 1859
Taxonomy articles created by Polbot